Hambal (also Romanized as Ḩambal; also known as Ḩammāl) is a village in Fasharud Rural District, in the Central District of Birjand County, South Khorasan Province, Iran. At the 2016 census, its population was 106, in 41 families.

References 

Populated places in Birjand County